Pronesopupa is a genus of minute, air-breathing land snails, terrestrial  pulmonate  gastropod  mollusks  in the family Pupillidae.

Species
Species within the genus Pronesopupa include:
 Pronesopupa acanthinula
 Pronesopupa boettgeri
 Pronesopupa frondicella
 Pronesopupa hystricella
 Pronesopupa incerta
 Pronesopupa lymaniana
 Pronesopupa molokaiensis
 Pronesopupa orycta
 Pronesopupa sericata

References 

 
Pupillidae
Taxonomy articles created by Polbot